Toledo 5, The CW (formerly ToledoVision 5 and Toledo's WB 5) was a cable channel serving Northwest Ohio, primarily serving the city of Toledo and Northwest Ohio. The channel was operated by Buckeye Cablesystem, and was originally exclusive to its subscribers, but expanded to other northwestern Ohio cable providers such as Time Warner Cable and Comcast. It was carried on channel 5 on Buckeye CableSystem and various other channel positions on Time Warner Cable and Comcast.

It existed in several forms from the launch of Buckeye as "The CableSystem" in 1971, first as a traditional public access station, and then in 1989 becoming a traditional independent station which aired programming traditionally aired in syndication by broadcast stations.

In 1995, the channel became an affiliate of The WB under the name Toledo's WB 5, using a logo with the fictitious call letters WT05. Following its merger with UPN, the channel joined The CW. Despite being a cable-only affiliate of The CW, the station never was part of The CW Plus and had been independently programmed by Block Communications and Buckeye with syndicated programming and films outside of network hours.

In September 2014, WTVG acquired Toledo 5's program inventory and CW affiliation from Buckeye, and moved it to its second digital subchannel, allowing a local over-the-air affiliate for the network.

History
The channel began broadcasting on August 7, 1989 as "ToledoVision 5", which initialized to "TV5" in local program listings. The channel originally aired on Buckeye Cablesystem's channel 5A, when the cable provider transmitted its cable channels over a dual-coaxial cable system divided into "A" and "B" sides. At the time of the channel's sign-on, ToledoVision 5 broadcast its programming daily from 5 p.m. to 12 a.m., with Travel Channel broadcasting over the channel space at other times. Notably, the channel's launch undercut an attempt by W48AP to become the market's second independent outlet upon its launch, as with Buckeye's backing, most of the syndicated programming not taken by Fox affiliate WUPW (channel 36) ended up with ToledoVision 5, along with a prime channel slot compared to W48AP's 29B slot and a refusal by Block Communications, which owned both The CableSystem and The Toledo Blade, to carry W48AP's listings outside of paid advertising. W48AP would end up carrying low-tier satellite networks by 1990, not coming back to any prominence until 1995.

The station also aired rebroadcasts of newscasts from ABC affiliate WTVG, and served as the Toledo area affiliate for Fox Sports Ohio's broadcasts of Cleveland Indians and Cincinnati Reds games before the channel was added to Buckeye's lineup. It also carried  SportsChannel America's package of National Hockey League games. The station joined The WB as a charter affiliate in 1995; W48AP, by then WNGT-LP, took the UPN affiliation. Eventually the Travel Channel found its own 24/7 channel slot, and the dual-coaxial system was converted to a modern single-coaxial digital system, leaving ToledoVision 5 on channel 5.

On January 24, 2006, CBS Corporation and Time Warner announced that they would shut down their respective networks, The WB and UPN that fall. In place of these networks, the two companies would form a new service called The CW, which would combine the most-watched programs from both UPN and The WB with new series produced specifically for the network. Well considered a strong WB affiliate, WT05 affiliated with The CW at launch in mid-September 2006, leaving WNGT with the MyNetworkTV affiliation and new calls in WMNT-CA. Over-the-air viewers with a strong enough antenna were (and still are) able to access the network through either WKBD-TV in Detroit or WBNX-TV from Akron (the network has since moved to WUAB in that market), depending on their location in the market. WKBD is also available on Buckeye, but only north of the Michigan/Ohio state line.

Transfer of schedule and affiliation to WTVG-DT2
On July 24, 2014, SJL Communications announced that it would sell WTVG to Gray Television. Gray indicated that it planned to add The CW to a digital subchannel. On September 1, 2014, Toledo 5's CW affiliation and lineup of syndicated programming was moved to the new "CW 13" channel on WTVG-DT2, replacing the Live Well Network over-the-air, and inheriting channel 5 on Buckeye's cable lineup.

Programming
Over the years, the station has carried various Toledo area sporting events including Toledo Mud Hens minor league baseball, and University of Toledo and Bowling Green State University football and basketball, to the point that Buckeye Cablesystem launched a regional all-sports network, Buckeye Cable Sports Network (BCSN) on January 7, 2004.

See also
Channel 5 branded TV stations in the United States

References

External links
Vintage Toledo TV: Toledovision 5

The CW affiliates
Television channels and stations established in 1971
Television channels and stations disestablished in 2014
Defunct local cable stations in the United States
Television stations in Toledo, Ohio
1971 establishments in Ohio
2014 disestablishments in Ohio
Defunct mass media in Ohio